Habaraduwa Central is a small town in Sri Lanka, located within Southern Province.

See also
List of towns in Southern Province, Sri Lanka

External links

Populated places in Southern Province, Sri Lanka